Anatrachyntis mythologica is a moth in the family Cosmopterigidae. It was described by Edward Meyrick in 1917, and is known from Sri Lanka.

References

Moths described in 1917
Anatrachyntis
Moths of Sri Lanka